The John B. Judkins Company of West Amesbury, Massachusetts, carriage and automobile body manufacturers built their first automobiles in the 1890s. West Amesbury, since re-named Merrimac, was an early center of American carriage-building.

Carriageworks established
John B. Judkins and Isaac Little established themselves in Amesbury as coachbuilders in 1857. Various new partners joined with Judkins and the firm's name changed to match but eventually two Judkins sons took charge after their father died in 1908.

Packard
Boston's Packard distributor, Alvan T Fuller, bought special bodies for the new Packard Twin Sixes that Packard put into production in 1915.

Lincoln
They also built coupés and berlines for Lincoln during the 1920s and during the Great Depression.

Trailers
During the 1930s Judkins added trailers to their product line. 

1938 saw their last coachbuilt body and in 1941 trailer production stopped and the business was liquidated.

References

External links

Luxury motor vehicle manufacturers
Coachbuilders of the United States
Defunct motor vehicle manufacturers of the United States
1853 establishments in Massachusetts
Manufacturing companies established in 1853 
Manufacturing companies based in Massachusetts